Alessandro del Torso (10 September 1883 – 7 November 1967) was an Italian skeleton racer who competed in the late 1920s. He finished seventh in the men's skeleton event at the 1928 Winter Olympics in St. Moritz.

References

External links
 
1928 men's skeleton results
Wallechinsky, David (1984). "Skeleton (Cresta Run)". The Complete Book of the Olympics: 1896-1980. New York: Penguin Books. p. 576.
Alessandro del Torso's profile at Sports Reference.com
Biography of Alessandro del Torso 

1883 births
1967 deaths
Italian male skeleton racers
Skeleton racers at the 1928 Winter Olympics
Olympic skeleton racers of Italy